The Butts Ground was a cricket ground in Coventry, Warwickshire.  The first recorded match on the ground was in 1872, when Coventry played a United South of England Eleven.  The first county match held at the ground came in 1882 when Warwickshire played Staffordshire, although this match was not first-class.  Warwickshire used the ground for first-class cricket from 1925 to 1930, playing the final first-class match held at the ground against Hampshire.    The site is today occupied by buildings.

References

External links
The Butts Ground on CricketArchive
The Butts Ground on Cricinfo

Defunct cricket grounds in England
Sports venues in Coventry
Defunct sports venues in the West Midlands (county)
Sports venues completed in 1872